The 1998 RTHK Top 10 Gold Songs Awards was held in 1998 for the 1997 music season.

Top 10 song awards
The top 10 songs (十大中文金曲) of 1998 are as follows.

Other awards

References
 RTHK top 10 gold song awards 1998

RTHK Top 10 Gold Songs Awards
Rthk Top 10 Gold Songs Awards, 1998
Rthk Top 10 Gold Songs Awards, 1998